Sergey Mokshantsev (born 22 January 1978) is a Russian racing driver from Moscow. After karting, he began his auto racing career in the Formula RUS series in 2006. He continued in the series in 2007 as well as making his debut in the Italian Formula Three Championship. He moved to the Italian Formula Master series in 2008 and competed in 2 races in the International Formula Master Series as well in addition to completing the Russian Formula Three Championship and placing 6th. In 2009 he signed to compete for Brian Stewart Racing in the Firestone Indy Lights Series, becoming the first Russian driver to compete in an IRL-sanctioned series. After skipping the Freedom 100, he left the series after the Toronto race with a best finish of 13th in eight starts.

Released following the 2009 Indy Lights season, Mokshantsev joined NTS Motorsports for 2012, switching to stock car racing with plans to run a limited schedule in the NASCAR K&N Pro Series East and Camping World Truck Series in preparation for a full-time Truck Series campaign in 2013, none of which materialized.

References

External links
 

Living people
1978 births
Russian racing drivers
Indy Lights drivers
Italian Formula Three Championship drivers
Russian Formula Three Championship drivers
International Formula Master drivers
Sportspeople from Moscow